Erigeron divergens is a species of flowering plant in the family Asteraceae known by the common name spreading fleabane. It is native to western North America.

This plant is highly variable in form. It is an annual or perennial herb growing from a taproot and sometimes a caudex. It is a hairy plant, and the hairs are usually glandular, at least near the top of the stem. The heads have 75 to 150 ray florets not more than 1 cm long which are white in color, fading purple, and sometimes absent. There are many yellow disc florets at the center.

The species exhibits agamospermy, asexual reproduction via seeds. Many, but not all, individuals are polyploid. There are many similar species both inside and outside the genus.

This plant can be found in the western half of the United States (as far east as western Texas), the Canadian provinces of British Columbia and Alberta, and the Mexican states of Baja California, Chihuahua, Durango, Nuevo León, and Sonora. It occurs in many types of habitat, including desert shrublands and scrubs, grassland, meadows, pinyon–juniper woodland, oak and pine woodlands, riparian habitat, sagebrush, and disturbed areas.

This plant had a number of uses in Native American traditional medicine. The Navajo used it as an aid in childbirth, as a lotion, an eyewash, and a treatment for snakebite and headache. It was a good luck charm among the Kiowa people.

References

External links
 The Jepson eFlora 2013
 United States Department of Agriculture plants profile
CalPhotos photo gallery, University of California

Flora of North America
Plants described in 1840
divergens